Moby Dick and Mighty Mightor is an American Saturday morning animated television series produced by Hanna-Barbera Productions that ran on CBS from September 9, 1967 to January 6, 1968, airing in reruns until September 6, 1969. Despite Moby's name coming first, he had only one short per half-hour episode, sandwiched between two with Mightor. The same structure was used the previous season for Frankenstein Jr. and The Impossibles.

Plot

Mightor
One day, while on a hunting trip, a teenage caveman named Tor (voiced by Bobby Diamond), along with his winged pet dinosaur Tog (vocal effects provided by John Stephenson), rescue an ancient hermit from an Allosaurus. As a reward, the hermit gives Tor a magical club. When Tor raises his club to the sky, he transforms into the masked and muscular Mightor (voiced by Paul Stewart), a prehistoric superhero who possesses superhuman strength and the power of flight through his club, which can also fire energy blasts. He can also transform Tog into a powerful fire-breathing dragon.

Mightor protects his village from evil-doers. Amongst the villagers are the chief Pondo (voiced by John Stephenson) and his daughter Sheera (voiced by Patsy Garrett). Sheera has a younger brother named Little Rok (voiced by Norma MacMillan), who loves pretending to be Mightor which often causes him to be saved from danger by Mightor on different occasions. The characters have several pets, including Little Rok's bird Ork (vocal effects provided by John Stephenson), and Sheera's mammoth calf Bollo (vocal effects provided by John Stephenson).

Mightor had recurring enemies like:

 Korg - An exiled member of Tor's tribe
 Serpent Queen (voiced by Jean Vander Pyl) - A serpent-themed female
 Kragor - The leader of the Cave Creatures
 Rog - The leader of the Stone Men
 Vultar - Leader of the Vulture Men
 Grok - A caveman who unleashed Tyrannor, and later stole the Golden Rock to control the beasts

Mightor bears a number of similarities to the Marvel superhero Thor, particularly during the early of run of the latter titular character's series. Both heroes having a secret identity of an ordinary, unassuming man with a superpowered alter ego when possessing a powerful mystical weapon. Their respective names and titles are quite similar as well.

Moby Dick
Teenage boys Tom (voiced by Bobby Resnick) and Tubb (voiced by Barry Balkin) are rescued by the great white whale Moby Dick (vocal effects provided by Don Messick) after a shipwreck. Together with their pet seal Scooby (vocal effects provided by Messick), they face the dangers of the undersea world.

Home media
On July 19, 2011, Warner Archive released Moby Dick and the Mighty Mightor: The Complete Series on DVD in region 1 as part of their Hanna-Barbera Classics Collection. This is a Manufacture-on-Demand (MOD) release, available exclusively through Warner's online store and Amazon.com.

Other appearances
Along with other Hanna-Barbera heroes, Mightor and Moby Dick appear in a crossover with a time-traveling Space Ghost during the final six episodes ("The Council of Doom") of the latter's original series.

Moby Dick and the Mighty Mightor and his friends appear in the comic book Hanna-Barbera Super TV Heroes #1–7 (April 1968 – Oct. 1969).

In 1972, Moby Dick appeared briefly in Yogi's Ark Lark when Captain Noah and Yogi Bear accidentally landed their flying ark on Moby's back.

Characters from Moby Dick later appear in Sealab 2021: Tubb as child actor star "Chubby Cox", and Scooby the seal as "Stinky Pete", whose appearances culminate in his eyes becoming near-demonic, uttering his catchphrase "I'm cha-cha-cha-cha-delicious".

Mightor makes some appearances in the Adult Swim show Harvey Birdman, Attorney at Law, as Judge Hiram Mightor and voiced by Gary Cole. Moby Dick appears in the episode "SPF", voiced by Wally Wingert.

Tom, Tubb, and Scooby the seal appears in the Scooby-Doo! Mystery Incorporated episode "The Midnight Zone" with Tom and Tubb voiced by Dee Bradley Baker. Moby Dick is depicted as a submarine piloted by Tom and Tubb. They helped Mystery Incorporated and Cassidy Williams to reach the Midnight Zone (the deepest part of the ocean near Crystal Cove) when World War II robots have been attacking Cassidy Williams.

Mightor and Moby Dick have cameos in the film Scooby-Doo! Mask of the Blue Falcon.

Mightor appears in Space Jam: A New Legacy. He is among the Warner Bros. 3000 Server-Verse inhabitants that watch the basketball game between the Tune Squad and the Goon Squad.

Mightor and Moby Dick appear in Jellystone!, voiced by Jim Conroy and Paul F. Tompkins. Mightor was shown as a wrestler who went up against The Funky Phantom in his infamous wrestling match. The Funky Phantom misused his ghostly powers on him causing the referee Gravity Girl to remove The Funky Phantom from the ring. Moby Dick appears in the episode "The Sea Monster of Jellystone Cove". He is mentioned to have a birthday and reside in Jellystone Cove. Moby Dick appears at the end of the episode where he rolls on everybody for being at his cove during his birthday.

A new incarnation of Mightor appears in the 2016 DC comic book series Future Quest, along with several other characters from Hanna-Barbera's action cartoons. This version is a young black boy of modern times who discovers the original's club and is transformed into a new Mightor, with the boy's pet cat becoming a powerful saber-toothed cat. This Mightor is mentored in his new heroic role by Birdman.

See also
 Moby-Dick, 1851 novel by Herman Melville
 List of works produced by Hanna-Barbera Productions
 List of Hanna-Barbera characters

References

External links
 
"The Mighty Mightor" at Don Markstein's Toonopedia. Archived from the original on February 23, 2016.
Moby Dick at Don Markstein's Toonopedia. Archived from the original on Mar h 8, 2016.
 Moby Dick and Mighty Mightor at The Big Cartoon DataBase

1967 American television series debuts
1969 American television series endings
1960s American animated television series
American children's animated action television series
American children's animated adventure television series
American children's animated science fantasy television series
American children's animated superhero television series
Hanna-Barbera superheroes
Hanna-Barbera characters
DC Comics superheroes
Television series by Hanna-Barbera
CBS original programming
Prehistoric people in popular culture
Fictional prehistoric characters
Fictional undersea characters
Works based on Moby-Dick
Teen superhero television series
Television series about cavemen